Ernesto Castano (2 May 1939 – 5 January 2023) was an Italian professional footballer who played as a defender. Throughout his club career he played for Legnano, Triestina, and Juventus, winning domestic titles at the latter club. At international level, he was a member of the Italy national team that won UEFA Euro 1968.

Club career
Castano was born in Cinisello Balsamo in the Province of Milan. He played club football for three Italian clubs throughout his career: Legnano, Triestina, and most prominently with Juventus, where he won several domestic titles, also serving as the team's captain.

International career
At international level, Castano also played for the Italy national team on seven occasions between 1959 and 1969, winning the 1968 UEFA European Championship on home soil.

Outside of football
On 3 July 1968, Castano founded the Italian Footballers' Association (AIC), in Milan, along with several fellow footballers, such as Giacomo Bulgarelli, Sandro Mazzola, Gianni Rivera, Giancarlo De Sisti, and Giacomo Losi, as well as the recently retired Sergio Campana, also a lawyer, who was appointed president of the association.

Castano died on 5 January 2023, at the age of 83.

Honours
Juventus
Coppa Italia: 1958–59, 1959–60, 1964–65
Serie A 1959–60, 1960–61, 1966–67

Italy
UEFA European Football Championship: 1968

References

1939 births
2023 deaths
People from Cinisello Balsamo
Sportspeople from the Metropolitan City of Milan
Italian footballers
Footballers from Lombardy
Association football defenders
Italy international footballers
Serie A players
Serie B players
A.C. Legnano players
U.S. Triestina Calcio 1918 players
Juventus F.C. players
UEFA Euro 1968 players
UEFA European Championship-winning players